Roberto Rojas González (born 17 November 1974 in Madrid) is a Spanish retired footballer who played as a right back.

Football career
Rojas graduated from Real Madrid's youth academy, and played in five matches with the first team during the 1998–99 season. His La Liga debut occurred on 14 November 1998, coming on as a substitute for Christian Panucci at the hour-mark of an eventual 1–2 home loss against Celta de Vigo.

Roja's most successful period was lived at Málaga CF, for whom he signed in the summer of 1999. He appeared in 32 games in his first year, helping the Andalusians retain their recently acquired top flight status, and went on to feature for the side that conquered the 2002 UEFA Intertoto Cup, but only played in 20 league matches in his last two campaigns combined.

After one year with Rayo Vallecano (third division), Rojas retired in 2007 at nearly 33 years of age, having played one season each with modest clubs from the Madrid area. He did not manage to score one goal during his professional career.

Rojas returned to Real Madrid in 2009, being appointed assistant manager in the Infantil A team. The following season, in the same capacity, he was promoted to the Cadete B. In 2011, he received his first head coaching assignment, returning to the Infantil.

Honours
Real Madrid
Intercontinental Cup: 1998

Málaga
UEFA Intertoto Cup: 2002

References

External links

1974 births
Living people
Footballers from Madrid
Spanish footballers
Association football defenders
La Liga players
Segunda División players
Segunda División B players
Real Madrid C footballers
Real Madrid Castilla footballers
Real Madrid CF players
Málaga CF players
Rayo Vallecano players
AD Alcorcón footballers
UEFA Champions League winning players